Grammy typically refers to the Grammy Awards.

Grammy may also refer to:

 Latin Grammy Awards, an award recognizing achievement in the Latin music industry
 GMM Grammy, a Thai entertainment company